Chaves Airport  is an airport serving Chaves in northern Portugal.

See also
Transport in Portugal
List of airports in Portugal

References

External links
 OurAirports - Chaves

Airports in Portugal